Sima Bina (Simā Binā, born 4 January 1945) is an Iranian traditional musician, composer, researcher, painter and teacher, described by Radio WDR Germany as the "grand lady of Iranian folk music". Bina's career in the performing arts has spanned more than five decades. Bina has been able to gather and revive a collection of nearly forgotten Iranian folk songs and melodies. She has done extensive research on their origin, which included collecting, recording, writing and re-interpreting popular regional music. Her works cover the entire spectrum of Iranian folk music including Mazandarani music, Kurdish music, Turkmen music, Baloch music, Lur music, Shirazi music, Bakhtiari music, and the music of North and South Khorasan.

Early life and career

Born in Birjand, Khorasan, in the heart of the popular tradition, she started her career on Iranian radio at the age of nine, under the guidance of her father, Ahmad Bina – a master of Iranian classical music and poet who wrote many of her early songs. Bina studied the radif repertoire and avaz vocal technique with great masters such as Maaroufi and Zarrin Panjeh. She went on to acquire her own solo program, Golhaye Sahraii (Flowers of the Desert), presenting a collection of folk songs and music from various regions of Iran.

After graduating from Tehran University in 1969, majoring in fine arts, Sima Bina continued her musical studies, and perfected her knowledge of the radif under the direction of Master Davami. Since 1993, she has accepted invitations to perform her music worldwide in festivals and organized concerts featuring Persian classical music. She currently lives between Cologne, Germany and Tehran, Iran.

Iranian Lullabies

While pursuing Iranian folksongs, Sima Bina often came across a variety of ethnic lullabies which she added to her collected works. This collection finally led to the creation of a book, called Iranian Lullabies in 2009. In this book, Bina not only shares her findings, her perception, the scores and visual expression of the selected lullabies with mothers, but also presents forty original Iranian lullabies in four volumes, where her vocals are sometimes blended in with the singing of the mothers, who had sung the lullabies to her in different parts of Iran.

See also 
 Music of Iran
 List of Iranian musicians

References

External links
 
 50 Iranian Women you Should Know: Maestra Sima Bina
 Bahār Navāi, Motherly Hums Audio slideshow (6 min 31 sec) 
  مستند دویچه وله درباره بانو سیما بینا، بانوی نت‌های گمشده 
 در اتوبوس مسافربری • پای صحبت بانو سیما بینا 
 نشست پزشکان ایرانی در آلمان با موضوع اخلاق و علم و اعطای نشان به بانو سیما بینا 

1945 births
Living people
Iranian composers
People from Birjand
Iranian folk singers
Iranian women singers
Women singers on Golha
Iranian women musicians
Persian-language singers
Kurdish-language singers
University of Tehran alumni
Iranian emigrants to Germany
Iranian expatriates in Germany
20th-century Iranian women singers